"Her Pilgrim Soul" is the first segment of the twelfth episode from the first season (1985–86) of the television series The Twilight Zone. It is about a scientist named Kevin whose holographic projector manifests a newborn and rapidly aging woman named Nola. The title comes from "When You Are Old", a poem by William Butler Yeats, a few lines of which are recited by Kevin just before Nola's farewell.

This story was made into a one-act stage musical by Alan Menken and paired with James Tiptree, Jr.'s "The Girl Who Was Plugged In" as a stage production titled Weird Romance: Two One Act Musicals of Speculative Fiction.

Plot
Kevin and Dan are scientists designing a holographic projector. One day, the device generates images of a human fetus which are not in the stored data. When they return the next day, the fetus has already matured into a young girl, who introduces herself as Nola Granville. Nola lived in Westchester County, New York during the early twentieth century. Dan calculates she is aging at a rate of ten years each day. They debate over whether or not Nola is a human soul somehow integrated into their hologram generator.

Kevin's marriage has already been strained by his spending all his time at the lab and his repeatedly postponing their plans to have children, and after he falls in love with Nola, he separates from his wife Carol so that he can remain by Nola's side 24 hours a day. He exhaustively questions Nola about her life, which she recalls as she matures to the relevant ages. They also discuss the poetry of Yeats. Nola relates meeting and falling in love with Robert, who her father objected to because he was Jewish. She becomes convinced that she has manifested in the projector to take care of some unfinished business, and asks Kevin to help her recall what it is. He searches for surviving acquaintances of Nola in hopes they may have the answer.

During the fifth day of studying Nola, she relives a miscarriage. Days later, Dan finds a surviving friend of Nola's, who tells him Nola died from the miscarriage, at the age of 35, and that Robert became despondent afterwards. Kevin is left wondering why Nola is still around when her real life ended when she was decades younger.

Nola uses a voice modifier to impersonate Kevin and tell Carol to come pick him up from the laboratory. She then wakes Kevin and tells him she must leave. She reveals that Kevin is Robert reincarnated; his grief at her death carried into his next life, causing his unwillingness to fully devote himself to Carol and his fear of having children. Nola's unfinished business was to give him closure by experiencing a life with her. He brings out the Yeats book and reads their favorite passage. Nola fades away. Carol enters the lab, and they have an emotional reunion. A toy ball bounces out of the holographic chamber and into Carol's hands.

Closing narration

Production
Alan Brennert's initial proposal for the episode did not contain the idea of Kevin being Nola's husband reincarnated and was more focused on scientific themes. CBS staff, while approving his proposal, suggested that the episode needed more of an emotional core. Reflecting on this, Brennert heavily revised the story into what he later described as "a sort of goodbye to a woman I loved very much" and who died at the age of 37 from leukemia in 1982.

Director Wes Craven, having never filmed anything with such extensive green screen usage, was taken off-guard by how time-consuming the episode was to shoot. Each of the scenes with Nola had to be shot three times: once with the normal human characters and set, once with Nola and the green screen, and once with the background to be imposed over the green screen, allowing Nola to be rendered as a holographic image. Eventually he discovered that he could shoot Kevin and Nola together using a method involving the Nola actress standing in front of a black cylinder, thus saving time; most of the scenes with Anne Twomey playing Nola were shot using this method. To have Kevin remotely play chess with Nola, a crew member manipulated the pieces by moving a magnetic wand under the chessboard.

Betsy Licon, who played age 5 Nola, performed well at the audition but experienced stage fright on the set. Craven could not coax her to speak loudly enough for filming purposes, so the voice of 5-year-old Nola was dubbed by Danica McKellar, who also played Nola at age 10.

References

External links
 

1985 American television episodes
The Twilight Zone (1985 TV series season 1) episodes
Television episodes about reincarnation

fr:L'Hologramme de l'amour